A total solar eclipse occurred on March 25, 1857. A solar eclipse occurs when the Moon passes between Earth and the Sun, thereby totally or partly obscuring the image of the Sun for a viewer on Earth. A total solar eclipse occurs when the Moon's apparent diameter is larger than the Sun's, blocking all direct sunlight, turning day into darkness. Totality occurs in a narrow path across Earth's surface, with the partial solar eclipse visible over a surrounding region thousands of kilometres wide.
Totality began at sunrise over southeastern Australia on March 26 (Thursday), crossing the Pacific ocean, and ended near sunset across Mexico on March 25 (Wednesday).

Related eclipses

Saros series 127

Notes

References
 NASA graphic
 Googlemap
 NASA Besselian elements
 
 Observations made at Sydney during the Eclipse of the Sun, March 26, 1857 Clarke, W. B., Monthly Notices of the Royal Astronomical Society, Vol. 18, p. 39–44 

1857 03 25
1857 in science
1857 03 25
March 1857 events